The Atheist Foundation of Australia (AFA) was established in South Australia in 1970, when The Rationalist Association of South Australia decided upon a name change to better declare its basic philosophy, namely atheism.

The foundation defines atheism as "the acceptance that there is no credible scientific or factually reliable evidence for the existence of a god, gods, or the supernatural." It rejects belief in a deity, the supernatural and superstition in general. The foundation considers religion unnecessary and often harmful. It favours the scientific method, and the discovery of physical laws, as the best way to understand the truth about reality. The foundation believes that humans are rational and ethical beings, capable of making responsible and creative contributions to society.

Aims

The objects of the Foundation are:

 To encourage and to provide a means of expression for informed free-thought on philosophical and social issues.
 To safeguard the rights of all non-religious people.
 To serve as a focal point for the community of non-religious people.
 To offer verifiable information in place of superstition and to promote logic and reason.
 To promote atheism.

Activism

The foundation organised the 2010 Global Atheist Convention in conjunction with Atheist Alliance International, and also helped organise the second Global Atheist Convention in 2012.

The foundation ran a campaign encouraging people to mark "No religion" on the 2011 Australian Census. Then-President David Nicholls stated that many people "simply marked down the religion they were born into, despite not now being religious people at all", and that as census results are used to gauge public funding to religious groups, this was giving religion more tax-payers' money than its entitlement. The AFA hired billboards around the country promoting the campaign. The 2011 census results showed that the percentage of people declaring no religion had risen from 18.7% in 2006 to 22.3%, becoming the second largest response. The AFA ran a similar campaign for the 2016 census; results showed the percentage of people declaring no religion rose to 30.1%, becoming the top response. In 2016, then-President Kylie Sturgess objected to non-religious individuals answering with joke answers in the census in response to the Jedi census phenomenon, as this would result in an underrepresentation of non-religious Australians.

See also
Council of Australian Humanist Societies
Human rights in Australia
Irreligion in Australia
Religion in Australia - includes Australian Bureau of Statistics census information relating to religion and belief.
Rationalist Society of Australia
The Secular Party of Australia
The National Secular Lobby
Major world religions
List of secularist organizations

References

External links

Human Rights Brief No. 3 Assessment of international law pertaining to freedom of religion and belief from Australian Human Rights and Equal Opportunity Commission

Atheism in Australia
Secularist organizations
Atheist organizations
Organizations established in 1970
Skeptic organisations in Australia
1970 establishments in Australia